Sorbaria is a genus of around four species of flowering plants belonging to the family Rosaceae.

Species
Accepted species include:
Sorbaria grandiflora (Sweet) Maxim.
Sorbaria kirilowii (Regel) Maxim.
Sorbaria sorbifolia (L.) A.Braun – false spiraea
Sorbaria tomentosa (Lindl.) Rehder – AGM

References

 
Rosaceae genera
Taxa named by Nicolas Charles Seringe
Taxa named by Alexander Braun